The Anthony–Buckley House is a historic Queen Anne style house in La Grande, Oregon, that was built in 1902.  It was listed on the National Register of Historic Places in 1985.

It is locally significant for its late Queen Anne style architecture;  it includes Stick/Eastlake and Colonial Revival elements, too.  The property also has original fencing of stone, cast iron, and woven wires.  It also is significant for association with Swiss immigrant John Anthony who first owned the house, and for association with Anthony Buckley.

References

Houses in Union County, Oregon
La Grande, Oregon
Houses completed in 1902
Houses on the National Register of Historic Places in Oregon
National Register of Historic Places in Union County, Oregon
1902 establishments in Oregon
Colonial Revival architecture in Oregon
Queen Anne architecture in Oregon
Stick-Eastlake architecture in Oregon